Filip Balaj (born 2 August 1997) is a Slovak professional footballer who plays as a forward for Trinity Zlín, on loan from Cracovia.

Club career

FC Nitra
He made his Fortuna Liga debut for Nitra against Žilina on 22 July 2017. He played in the starting line-up, for 88 minutes, before being replaced by Márius Charizopulos. He scored game's sole winning goal, utilising the assist of Tomáš Kóňa.

References

External links
 FC Nitra official club profile 
 
 Futbalnet profile

1997 births
Living people
People from Zlaté Moravce
Sportspeople from the Nitra Region
Slovak footballers
Slovakia youth international footballers
Slovakia under-21 international footballers
Association football forwards
FC Nitra players
MŠK Žilina players 
FC ViOn Zlaté Moravce players
MKS Cracovia (football) players
FC Fastav Zlín players
Slovak Super Liga players
Ekstraklasa players
III liga players
Slovak expatriate footballers
Expatriate footballers in Poland
Slovak expatriate sportspeople in Poland
Slovak people of Albanian descent
Expatriate footballers in the Czech Republic
Slovak expatriate sportspeople in the Czech Republic